The Woodstock Historic District encompasses most of the historic center of Woodstock, Virginia.  Founded in 1761, it is the oldest community in Shenandoah County, which is reflected in its architecture.  The historic district is organized around three major north–south axes: Main Street (Virginia State Route 11), Water Street, and the right-of-way of the Norfolk and Southern Railway.  It includes some of the best examples of residential architecture in the town from its founding into the early 20th century, as well as many civic, religious, commercial and industrial buildings from that period, and has been relatively little altered since the 1940s.

The district was listed on the National Register of Historic Places in 1995.

See also
National Register of Historic Places listings in Shenandoah County, Virginia

References

Historic districts on the National Register of Historic Places in Virginia
National Register of Historic Places in Shenandoah County, Virginia
Federal architecture in Virginia
Greek Revival architecture in Virginia
Italianate architecture in Virginia
Buildings and structures completed in 1761
Historic districts in Virginia